The 2004 Giro d'Italia was the 87th edition of the Giro d'Italia, one of cycling's Grand Tours. The Giro began in Genoa, with a Prologue individual time trial on 8 May, and Stage 10 occurred on 19 May with a stage to Ascoli Piceno. The race finished in Milan on 30 May.

Prologue
8 May 2004 — Genoa,  (ITT)

Stage 1
9 May 2004 — Genoa to Alba,

Stage 2
10 May 2004 — Novi Ligure to Pontremoli,

Stage 3
11 May 2004 — Pontremoli to Corno alle Scale,

Stage 4
12 May 2004 — Porretta Terme to Civitella in Val di Chiana,

Stage 5
13 May 2004 — Civitella in Val di Chiana to Spoleto,

Stage 6
14 May 2004 — Spoleto to Valmontone,

Stage 7
15 May 2004 — Frosinone to Montevergine di Mercogliano,

Stage 8
16 May 2004 — Giffoni Valle Piana to Policoro,

Stage 9
17 May 2004 — Policoro to Carovigno,

Rest day 1
18 May 2004

Stage 10
19 May 2004 — Porto Sant'Elpidio to Ascoli Piceno,

References

2004 Giro d'Italia
Giro d'Italia stages